Diana and I is a British made-for-television film that explores how the death of Diana, Princess of Wales, affected ordinary people. Written by Jeremy Brock and directed by Peter Cattaneo it tells the stories of four people, and how they react to the news of the Princess's death, following their lives from when the news broke on 31 August 1997 to Diana's funeral on 6 September. The film aired on BBC Two in the United Kingdom on 4 September 2017.

Cast
 Zoe Aldrich – Anne 
 Ben Abell – Mechanic
 Yves Aubert –	Albert
 Ant Bacon – Policeman
 Kelva Barrett	– Debt Collector
 Kingsley Ben-Adir	– Russell
 Victoria Cyr – Tourist
 Laurie Davidson – Michael Lewis
 Elly Fairman – Julie
 John Gordon Sinclair – Gordon

References

External links

2017 in British television
2017 television films
2017 films
2017 drama films
BBC television dramas
British television films
Films about Diana, Princess of Wales
Films set in 1997
2010s English-language films